Thomas David Williams, known as Tommy Williams (born December 17, 1956), 
is a Republican former member of the Texas Senate, who represented District 4 in The Woodlands in Montgomery County in the Houston suburbs.

Background
Williams was first elected to the Texas Senate in 2002, after incumbent District 4 Senator David Bernsen, a Democrat, declined to seek re-election after redistricting changed the composition of the district. (Bernsen instead ran unsuccessfully for Texas Land Commissioner, losing that race to Jerry E. Patterson.)

After more than ten years in office, Williams, the chairman of the Senate Finance Committee, was in October 2013 in the process of resigning, to accept a government relations position at his alma mater, Texas A&M University in College Station. On October 3, Williams confirmed that he would not run again in the Republican primary election scheduled for March 4, 2014.

Williams previously served three terms from 1997 to 2003 in the Texas House of Representatives. Williams has served as president of Woodforest Financial Services, an affiliate of Woodforest National Bank. Williams started his new position at Texas A&M on December 2, 2013.

Among those seeking to fill Williams' Senate seat were neighboring State Representatives Steve Toth of District 15 in The Woodlands and Brandon Creighton of District 16 in Conroe, both of Montgomery County. Creighton defeated Toth in a runoff election to claim the seat.

Election results

Most recent election

2004

Previous elections

2002

2000

1998

1996

References

External links
Senate of Texas - Senator Tommy Williams
Tommy Williams Texas Senator campaign website
Project Vote Smart - Senator Tommy Williams (TX) profile
Follow the Money - Tommy Williams
2006 2004 2002 2000 1998 campaign contributions

1956 births
Living people
People from Marshall, Texas
People from The Woodlands, Texas
Republican Party members of the Texas House of Representatives
Republican Party Texas state senators
American bankers
Texas A&M University alumni
21st-century American politicians
American United Methodists